The 2000–01 season was Kalamata' 2nd straight season on the Greek first tier. The team had finished well the previous season and was set to play in Europe for the first time. However, the team was relegated, and also exited at first opportunity both in the domestic cup and Intertoto Cup, even fielding a reserve squad in the first leg of the latter competition.

Players

Squad

 

|}

Players who left during the season

|}

Managers
Vasilis Georgopoulos: start of season – 30 June 2001

Alpha Ethniki

League table

UEFA Intertoto Cup

Third round

References
Weltfussball

Kalamata F.C. seasons
Kalamata